This list of English criminal offences is a partial categorization of English criminal law offences.

Offences against the person

Offences against property

Offences under the Explosive Substances Act 1883
Offences under the Computer Misuse Act 1990

Firearms and offensive weapons

Offences under section 1(1) of the Prevention of Crime Act 1953
Offences under sections 139 and 139A of the Criminal Justice Act 1988
Offences under the Knives Act 1997

Forgery, personation and cheating

See forgery:
Offences under Part I of the Forgery and Counterfeiting Act 1981
Falsification of pedigree, contrary to section 183(1)(b) of the Law of Property Act 1925
Improper alteration of the registers, contrary to section 124 of the Land Registration Act 2002
Offences under section 8 of the Non-Parochial Registers Act 1840
Offences under sections 36 and 37 of the Forgery Act 1861
Forgery of passport, contrary to section 36 of the Criminal Justice Act 1925
Offences under sections 133 and 135 of the County Courts Act 1984
Offences under section 13 of the Stamp Duties Management Act 1891; and supplementary offences under sections 14 and 15
Offences under section 6 of the Hallmarking Act 1973
Offences under section 126 of the Mental Health Act 1983
Offences under sections 121 and 122(6) of the Gun Barrel Proof Act 1868
Motor vehicle document offences:
Offences under section 97AA and 99(5) of the Transport Act 1968
Offences under section 65 of the Public Passenger Vehicles Act 1981
Offences under section 115 of the Road Traffic Regulation Act 1984
Offences under section 173 of the Road Traffic Act 1988
Offences under regulations 11(1) to (3) of the Motor Vehicles (E.C. Type Approval) Regulations 1992 (S.I. 1992/3107) made under section 2(2) of the European Communities Act 1972
Offences under section 44 of the Vehicles Excise and Registration Act 1994
Offences under regulations 10(1) to (3) the Motor Cycle (E.C. Type Approval) Regulations 1995 (S.I. 1995/1531) made under section 2(2) of the European Communities Act 1972
Offences under section 38 of the Goods Vehicles (Licensing of Operators) Act 1995

See personation:
Personation of a juror
Offences under section 90(1) of the Police Act 1996
Offences under section 30(1) of the Commissioners for Revenue and Customs Act 2005
Offences under section 34 of the Forgery Act 1861
Offences under section 24 of the Family Law Reform Act 1969
Offences under section 60 of the Representation of the People Act 1983

See cheating:
Offences under section 17 of the Gaming Act 1845
Offences under section 1 of the Fraudulent Mediums Act 1951

Offences against the state

High treason
Misprision of treason
Compounding treason
Treason felony
Attempting to injure or alarm the Sovereign, contrary to section 2 of the Treason Act 1842
Contempt of the sovereign
Trading with the enemy
Offences under the Official Secrets Acts 1911 to 1989
Offences under the Incitement to Disaffection Act 1934
Causing disaffection, contrary to section 91 of the Police Act 1996
Causing disaffection, contrary to section 6 of the Ministry of Defence Police Act 1987
Incitement to sedition or disaffection or promoting industrial unrest, contrary to section 3 of the Aliens Restriction (Amendment) Act 1919
Offences of procuring and assisting desertion under military law
Offences relating to terrorism
Offences of directing quasi military organizations and wearing uniforms for political purposes under the Public Order Act 1936
Piracy iure gentium
Piracy with violence, contrary to the Piracy Act 1837
Offences under the Slave Trade Act 1824
Offences under the Foreign Enlistment Act 1870
Offences under the Immigration Act 1971
Coinage offences under Part II of the Forgery and Counterfeiting Act 1981
Offences relating to public stores under the Public Stores Act 1875
Offences relating to military stores under military law
Offences against postal and electronic communication services
Misconduct in public office
Refusal to execute public office
Offences of selling public offices under the Sale of Offices Act 1551 and Sale of Offices Act 1809
Purchasing the office of clerk of the peace or under-sheriff, contrary to section 27 of the Sheriffs Act 1887
Cheating the public revenue
Offences under the Customs and Excise Management Act 1979
Tax evasion and money laundering offences

See also Offences against military law in the United Kingdom

Harmful or dangerous drugs

 Offences under the Misuse of Drugs Act 1971, the Intoxicating Substances (Supply) Act 1985, the Licensing Act 2003, section 7 of the Children and Young Persons Act 1933 and other provisions relating to tobacco, and the Drug Trafficking Act 1994.
 Offences under the Psychoactive Substances Act 2016.

Offences against religion and public worship

Offences under sections 75 to 77 of the Marriage Act 1949

Offences of disturbing public worship

Offences under section 2 of the Ecclesiastical Courts Jurisdiction Act 1860
Offences under section 7 of the Burial Laws Amendment Act 1880
Offences under section 59 of the Cemeteries Clauses Act 1847
Offences under articles 18 and 19 of the Local Authorities' Cemeteries Order 1977 (SI 1977/204)

Offences against the administration of public justice

Doing an act tending and intended to pervert the course of public justice - a.k.a. perverting the course of justice, defeating the ends of justice, obstructing the administration of justice
Concealing evidence, contrary to section 5(1) of the Criminal Law Act 1967
Contempt of court a.k.a. criminal contempt
Intimidation, contrary to section 51(1) of the Criminal Justice and Public Order Act 1994
Taking or threatening to take revenge, contrary to section 51(2) of the Criminal Justice and Public Order Act 1994
Perjury, contrary to section 1 of the Perjury Act 1911
Perjury, contrary to section 6 of the Piracy Act 1850
Offences under sections 2 to 4 of the Perjury Act 1911
Making a false statutory declaration, contrary to section 5 of the Perjury Act 1911
Offences under section 6 of the Perjury Act 1911
Fabrication of false evidence
Offences under section 89 of the Criminal Justice Act 1967
Offences under 106 of the Magistrates' Courts Act 1980
Offences under section 11(1) of the European Communities Act 1972
Escape
Permitting an escape
Assisting a prisoner to escape, contrary to section 39 of the Prison Act 1952
Breach of prison/breaking prison
Rescue/rescuing a prisoner in custody
Harboring an escaped prisoner, contrary to section 22(2) of the Prison Act 1952
Taking part in a prison mutiny, contrary to section 1(1) of the Prison Security Act 1992
Offences under section 128 of the Mental Health Act 1983
Causing a wasteful employment of the police, contrary to section 5(2) of the Criminal Law Act 1967
Administering an unlawful oath, contrary to section 13 of the Statutory Declarations Act 1835

Public order offences

Offences under the Public Order Act 1986
Offences under section 31 of the Crime and Disorder Act 1998
Offences under Part V of the Criminal Justice and Public Order Act 1994
Offences under Part II of the Criminal Law Act 1977
Offences under the Protection from Eviction Act 1977
Bomb hoaxes, contrary to section 51 of the Criminal Law Act 1977

Offences against public morals and public policy

Bigamy, contrary to section 57 of the Offences against the Person Act 1861

Offences under section 2(1) of the Obscene Publications Act 1959
Offences under section 2(2) of the Theatres Act 1968
Certain offences under the Postal Services Act 2000
Offences under section 1(1) of the Indecent Displays (Control) Act 1981
Offences under section 1(1) of the Protection of Children Act 1978
Offences under section 160 of the Criminal Justice Act 1988
Offences under section 170 of the Customs and Excise Management Act 1979 consisting of importation in breach of the prohibition under section 42 of the Customs Consolidation Act 1876
Offences under the Bribery Act 2010

Protection of children and vulnerable adults

 Child sexual exploitation
 Child trafficking
 Protection of Children Act 1978
 Offenses under the Safeguarding Vulnerable Groups Act 2006

Protection of animals and the environment

See Cruelty to animals#United Kingdom and Environmental crime

 Offenses under the Animal Welfare Act 2006
 Mutilation
 Docking (animal)
 Animal fighting

Road traffic and motor vehicle offences

Participatory and inchoate offences

Encouraging or assisting crime - Part 2 of the Serious Crime Act 2007
Soliciting to murder, contrary to section 4 of the Offences against the Person Act 1861
Aiding, abetting, counselling or procuring the commission of an offence
Conspiracy, contrary to section 1(1) of the Criminal Law Act 1977
Conspiracy to defraud
Conspiracy to corrupt public morals
Conspiracy to outrage public decency
Attempt, contrary to section 1(1) of the Criminal Attempts Act 1981

Parts 1 to 3 of Schedule 3 to the Serious Crime Act 2007 list numerous statutory offences of assisting, encouraging, inciting, attempting or conspiring at the commission of various crimes.

Other

Mayhem
Kidnapping
False imprisonment
Cheating the public revenue
High treason
Misprision of treason (disputed - alleged to be statutory)
Compounding treason
Contempt of the sovereign
Misconduct in public office
Refusal to execute public office
Doing an act tending and intended to pervert the course of public justice - a.k.a. perverting the course of justice, defeating the ends of justice, obstructing the administration of justice
Contempt of court a.k.a. criminal contempt
Fabrication of false evidence
Escape
Permitting an escape
Breach of prison/breaking prison
Rescue/rescuing a prisoner in custody
Public nuisance
Outraging public decency
Conspiracy to defraud
Conspiracy to corrupt public morals
Conspiracy to outrage public decency
Common assault aka assault (disputed - held to now be statutory, said obiter not to be)
battery (disputed - held to now be statutory, said obiter not to be)
Assault with intent to rob (may now be statutory)
Rape
Assault with intent to rape (continued existence disputed)

See also
English criminal law

Notes

References

English criminal law